JA Pérez is a Cuban humanitarian, author, and evangelist.  He has written more than 20 books under the pseudonym of Jorge Armando Pérez Venâncio, taking the second last name of Venâncio, in honor of his grandfather, Francisco Venâncio.

Early life 
J.A. Pérez was born in a small village named El Gabriel, in the province of Havana, Cuba. He has two younger brothers. His father, Armando Pérez Martín, is a radiologist; his mother, Teresita Juana María Hernandez, is an English teacher and controller for an American tobacco company.

His twin younger brothers suffered from health problems as children, requiring frequent hospitalizations. Consequently, Pérez spent most of his childhood years under the care of his maternal grandparents, Francisco Venâncio Hernandez and Hilda Alfonso.

Early influences 
Pérez was influenced greatly by his grandfather Francisco, who was known in El Gabriel as "Pancho el Largo" (meaning "Tall Frank" in English). Francisco was a tall man, born and raised by monks in a monastery in the Canary Islands.

When Pérez was young, his grandfather would read him short stories and passages from an old Nacar Colunga Bible. By the time Pérez was five years old, he knew all of Aesop's Fables by heart.

Humanitarian work 
Pérez runs an organization which brings humanitarian campaigns to countries in Latin America. His team includes medical professionals, family counselors, and volunteers. The organization recently held a Humanitarian Festival in Costa Rica called the "Republic of Joy", with over 18,000 people in attendance. Teams of doctors and dentists worked during the day at the Rafael Ángel Camacho Cordero Stadium, providing care to low-income families.

Mass events 
 
Pérez also organizes festivals which are held at stadiums or plazas. During the day, ongoing educational workshops are offered.  Arts, theater, and music productions are held, with a concert every night. At every festival, Pérez speaks to the audience.

Other mass events were held in 2014 in Corail, Beaumont, and Roseaux in Haiti.  There, Pérez collaborated with the Luis Palau Association to hold a city-wide concert by the Reggae group Christafari.

Books by pen name

Jorge Armando Pérez Venancio 
 Los Profetas de Gúlumm  Publisher: Keen Sight Books (May 27, 2009)
 El Fin de Toda Jactancia: Exaltando la completa obra de Jesucristo  (June 16, 2009)
 Lecciones de un Viejo Profeta Mentiroso  (April 18, 2010)
 Las Reglas que Regulan la Abundancia: 10 reglas elementales que le ayudarán a prosperar de la manera que Dios quiere  (December 30, 2010)
 Las Suegras: 7 principios para mejorar las relaciones entre nueras y suegras  Publisher: Independent Publishing Platform (July 1, 2009)
 Evangelismo Efectivo: Manual Interactivo Escuela de Evangelismo  Publisher: Independent Publishing Platform (July 29, 2009)
 Saber Llegar: No se trata de llegar primero  Publisher: Independent Publishing Platform (January 6, 2010)
 La Ciencia del Pobre  Publisher: CreateSpace Independent Publishing Platform (February 7, 2011)

J.A. Pérez 
 Lider con Mente de Reino: 10 principios culturalmente sensitivos para el liderazgo internacional  Publisher: Keen Sight Books (April 28, 2013)
 Poetas, Profetas y Otros con Imaginación  Publisher: Independent Publishing Platform (November 27, 2011)
 40 Profecias Cumplidas  Publisher: Keen Sight Books (August 21, 2012)
 El Fin: Estado Profetico de las Naciones  Publisher: Keen Sight Books; 1 edition (December 27, 2012)
 100 Dias de Comunion, Sabiduria y Gracia  Publisher: Keen Sight Books (September 21, 2012)
 Juntos por el Continente  Publisher: Keen Sight Books 1 edition (April 13, 2013)

References

Year of birth missing (living people)
Living people
Humanitarians
Evangelists
People from Havana
Cuban non-fiction writers
Cuban male writers
Male non-fiction writers